Ruan Cornelius Adriaan Kramer (born ) is a South African rugby union player for  in the Currie Cup and the Rugby Challenge. His regular position is prop.

References

South African rugby union players
Living people
1995 births
Rugby union players from Bloemfontein
Rugby union props
Griffons (rugby union) players
Griquas (rugby union) players
Sharks (Currie Cup) players
Pumas (Currie Cup) players